Németfalu is a village in Zala County, Hungary. It lies about 15 km west of Zalaegerszeg. The lake of Kustánszeg offers a good view on the village.

History
The village is first mentioned in 1266, the name refers to German settlers.

References

External links

Populated places in Zala County